Harold James "Hal" Crisler (December 31, 1923 – November 2, 1987) was an American football end in the National Football League for the Boston Yanks, the Washington Redskins, and the Baltimore Colts. He attended San José State University and Iowa State University.

Crisler also played four games for the Boston Celtics of the Basketball Association of America during the 1946–47 season.

BAA career statistics

Regular season

References

External links

1923 births
1987 deaths
Sportspeople from Richmond, California
American football ends
San Jose State Spartans football players
Iowa State Cyclones football players
Boston Celtics players
Boston Yanks players
Washington Redskins players
Baltimore Colts (1947–1950) players
American men's basketball players